The North East India Development Party (NEIDP) is a regional North-East-centric political party primarily based in Manipur (India). It was formed on 23 December 2015 and registered with the Election Commission of India.

History 

North East India Development Party (NEIDP) was founded by Shri Narengbam Samarjit Singh,

The registered Head Office of the Party is at Sagolband Tera Loukrakpam Leikai, Imphal West – 795001, Manipur, India. The flag of North East India Development Party (NEIDP) is of white background with 7 (seven) colours of stars (black, red, white, blue, yellow, green and violet) arranged in numerical 8 (eight) shape in the middle of the flag.

Objective of The Party
•      North East India Development Party is a political organization.

Symbolic meaning and significance of the flag

• White background stands for TRUTH.

• Number of STARS stand for North East Region of our country namely Seven Sisters.

• Numerical figure 8 (eight) shape stands for unity amongst the stars and the colours.

• Seven colours stands for the natural gift bestowed to the Seven Sisters.

Commitment

Achieving all round development through social revolution, economy revolution and political revolution within 20 years in Manipur as well as in whole north east region.

Functionaries of the Party

With the gaining of the party's popularity, there is a constant upgradation. Some of the functionaries of the party are mentioned below.

• Shri Narengbam Samarjit    

• Shri Elangbam Brojendro       

• Shri Narengbam Biswarjit Singh

• Shri Doukhomang Khongsai

• Sapam Kunjakeswor Singh  

• Shri Takhelchangbam Ravi Sharma

• Shri Meinam Somorjit            

• Shri Wahengbam Khelindra        

• Shri Yumlembam Brogendro       

• Shri Akhoijam Deepanand 	     

• Tourangbam Tikendra Singh	   

• Shri Mayanglambam Tolenjao

• Shri Koijam Rosan	

• Shri Tayenjam Sadananda	

• Shri Takhellambam Tomba		

• Shri Chingtham Shyamson	

• Shrimati Leishangthem Sumila	

• Shrimati Haobijam Sumila	

• Shrimati Laimayum Binaka

• Shri Maibam Soto		

• Shri Premjit Ngairangbam

NEIDP in the 2017 Manipur Legislative Assembly Election

NEIDP projected 13 candidates out of the total 60 seats of the Manipur Legislative Assembly however the party did not win any seat. Considering the youngness of the party which was established in 2015, the performance of the party was viewed by many as the party with potential. It secured a total of 56,185 popular votes which is 3.4% from the 13 candidates. Below are the candidates of NEIDP with their statistics.

2019 Lok Sabha Election

Candidates for Manipur

Inner Manipur (Lok Sabha constituency): R.K Anand

Outer Manipur (Lok Sabha constituency): Ashang Kasar

References

Political parties in Manipur
Political parties established in 2015
2015 establishments in Manipur
Recognised state political parties in India